The Junior women's race at the 2005 IAAF World Cross Country Championships was held at the Hippodrome Joseph Desjoyaux in Saint-Galmier near Saint-Étienne, France, on March 19, 2005.  Reports on the event were given in The New York Times, in the Glasgow Herald, and for the IAAF.

Complete results for individuals,  for teams, medallists, and the results of British athletes who took part were published.

Race results

Junior women's race (6.153 km)

Individual

Teams

Note: Athletes in parentheses did not score for the team result.

Participation
According to an unofficial count, 117 athletes from 34 countries participated in the Junior women's race.  This is in agreement with the official numbers as published.

 (6)
 (1)
 (4)
 (3)
 (6)
 (2)
 (2)
 (5)
 (6)
 (2)
 (6)
 (6)
 (1)
 (6)
 (1)
 (1)
 (1)
 (1)
 (6)
 (1)
 (2)
 (4)
 (1)
 (1)
 (5)
 (6)
 (1)
 (6)
 (6)
 (4)
 (6)
 (6)
 (1)
 (1)

See also
 2005 IAAF World Cross Country Championships – Senior men's race
 2005 IAAF World Cross Country Championships – Men's short race
 2005 IAAF World Cross Country Championships – Junior men's race
 2005 IAAF World Cross Country Championships – Senior women's race
 2005 IAAF World Cross Country Championships – Women's short race

References

Junior women's race at the World Athletics Cross Country Championships
IAAF World Cross Country Championships
2005 in women's athletics
2005 in youth sport